Robert Dorian Stănici (born 7 June 2001) is a Romanian professional footballer who plays as a midfielder for CS Tunari.

Club career

Rapid București
He made his debut on 18 December 2021 for Rapid București in Liga I match against FC Botoșani.

Career statistics

Club

References

External links

 Robert Stănici at lpf.ro

2001 births
Living people
Footballers from Bucharest
Romanian footballers
Association football midfielders
Liga I players
Liga III players
Romania youth international footballers
FC Rapid București